Curup is a town and district of Rejang Lebong Regency, part of Bengkulu Province of Indonesia. It is also the administrative capital of the regency. Curup is the second-largest town in the province of Bengkulu. Curup District has an area of 6.21 km², consisting of nine Administrative villages, with 26,971 residents at the 2020 Census, rising to 27,017 in the official estimates as at mid 2021. However, the urban area of which Curup District is the centre - including also South Curup (Curop Selatan), North Curup (Curop Utara), Central Curup (Curop Tengah), and East Curup (Curop Timur) Districts - covered 174.05 km² and had a mid 2021 population of 130,888.

Curup is the main producing area for rice, vegetables and coffee in Bengkulu Province, whose harvests are sent to Palembang, Jambi, Padang, Lampung and Jakarta.

Some of the famous tourist spots are Suban Hot Spring, Bastari Lake, Mount Kaba, the Waterfall in Kepala Curup, Tabarena and prehistoric sites such as Panco Stone.

This area is also known as the habitat of Rafflesia arnoldii.

Climate
Curup has an elevation moderated tropical rainforest climate (Af) with moderate rainfall from June to August and heavy rainfall in the remaining months.

References

Rejang Lebong Regency
districts of Bengkulu
Regency seats of Bengkulu
Populated places in Bengkulu